Human Highway may refer to:

 Human Highway, a 1982 comedy film
 Human Highway (band), a Canadian indie rock band
 "Human Highway", a song on the 1978 Neil Young album Comes a Time